Madison Mills is the name of multiple populated places:

 Madison Mills, Ohio
 Madison Mills, Virginia